Urbanowicz is a Polish surname, which literally means " Descendant of Urban". It may refer to:

Witold Urbanowicz (1908-1996), Polish fighter ace
Tomasz Urbanowicz (born 1959),  Polish architect, designer of artistic glass in architecture
Chris Urbanowicz, British musician
Matty Louis Urbanowicz, birth name of Matt Urban, according to the Guinness Book of World Records, the most decorated American serviceman
Maciej Urbanowicz, Polish ice hockey player, 2008 World Championship team

Polish-language surnames